Pilea repens is a plant which is sometimes cultivated, especially where high humidity can be provided, such as in a terrarium.  It is native to the West Indies and has dark-colored leaves.

References

repens